Lithophragma cymbalaria is a species of flowering plant in the saxifrage family known by the common name mission woodland star.

It is endemic to California, where it is known from moist, shady habitat in the California Coast Ranges and canyons from the San Francisco Bay Area to the Transverse Ranges in the Los Angeles region, and the northern Channel Islands of California.

Description
Lithophragma cymbalaria  is a rhizomatous perennial herb growing erect or leaning with a slender naked flowering stem. The small leaves are mostly located on the lower part of the stem, each divided into three rounded lobes.

The stem bears 2 to 8 flowers, each in a cuplike calyx of red or green sepals. The five petals are white, under one centimeter long, and smooth along the edges or very shallowly toothed.

External links
Jepson Manual Treatment
Photo gallery

cymbalaria
Endemic flora of California
Natural history of the California chaparral and woodlands
Natural history of the California Coast Ranges
Natural history of the Channel Islands of California
Natural history of the Santa Monica Mountains
Natural history of the Transverse Ranges
Taxa named by Asa Gray
Taxa named by John Torrey
Flora without expected TNC conservation status